The Roman Catholic Diocese of Bauru is a diocese located in the Brazilian city of Bauru (São Paulo State) in the Ecclesiastical Province of the Roman Catholic Archdiocese of Botucatu in the city of Botucatu (also in São Paulo State).

History
 February 15, 1964: Established as Diocese of Bauru from the Metropolitan Archdiocese of Botucatu and Diocese of Lins

Bishops
 Bishops of Bauru (Roman rite), in reverse chronological order
 Bishop Caetano Ferrari, O.F.M. (2009.04.15 - present)
 Bishop Luiz Antônio Guedes (2001.10.24 – 2008.07.30); transferred by Pope Benedict XVI to be Bishop of the Roman Catholic Diocese of Campo Limpo in Campo Limpo (São Paulo State)
 Bishop Aloysio José Leal Penna, S.J. (1990.09.04 – 2000.06.07); elevated by Pope John Paul II to be Archbishop of the Roman Catholic Archdiocese of Botucatu
 Bishop Cândido Rubens Padín, O.S.B. (1970.04.27 – 1990.09.04)
 Bishop Vicente Ângelo José Marchetti Zioni (1964.03.25 – 1968.03.27); elevated by Pope Paul VI to be Archbishop of the Roman Catholic Archdiocese of Botucatu

Coadjutor bishop
Aloysio José Leal Penna, S.J. (1984-1987)

Other priest of this diocese who became bishop
Luiz Antônio Lopes Ricci, appointed Auxiliary Bishop of Niterói, Rio de Janeiro in 2017

Sources
 GCatholic.org
 Catholic Hierarchy

References 

Roman Catholic dioceses in Brazil
Christian organizations established in 1964
Bauru, Roman Catholic Diocese of
Roman Catholic dioceses and prelatures established in the 20th century